Abdul Wahid bin Omar (Jawi: عبدالواحد بن عمر; born 1964) is the non-executive chairman of Bursa Malaysia since 1 May 2020. He is also the chairman of the board of directors of Universiti Kebangsaan Malaysia (UKM), one of Malaysia top universities, since 1 November 2018.

He was the former Group Chairman of Permodalan Nasional Berhad (PNB), a Malaysia's government-linked investment company and one of the country's largest fund management company from August 2016 to June 2018. Previously, he was appointed as a Senator and Minister in the Prime Minister's Department in charge of Economic Planning, serving from June 2013 to June 2016. He is also known as the former President & CEO of Maybank from 2008 to 2013, Malaysia's largest public listed company and one of the leading financial services groups in Southeast Asia. His major contribution to corporate world is overseeing the turnaround of UEM Group, Telekom Malaysia and Maybank.

Background
Abdul Wahid was born in Johor Bahru, Johor, in 1964 and was the ninth child out of eleven siblings. He received his secondary education at MRSM Seremban from 1977 to 1981 before furthering his study to United Kingdom under Majlis Amanah Rakyat (MARA) scholarships.

With over 28 years of corporate and public sector experience, Abdul Wahid has led three major organisations in financial services, telecommunications and infrastructure development. He led the transformation of Telekom Malaysia into a regional telecommunications group (prior to its demerger with Axiata in 2008) and spearheaded the turnaround of the UEM Group, Malaysia's leading infrastructure conglomerate following its takeover by Khazanah Nasional in 2001.

Abdul Wahid is a fellow of the Association of Chartered Certified Accountants (ACCA), United Kingdom, a member of the Malaysian Institute of Accountants (MIA) and the Institute of Chartered Accountants in England & Wales (ICAEW).

Careers

1987–2001: Early years
Abdul Wahid started his career with KPMG Peat Marwick in 1987. He then worked at an investment bank, Bumiputra Merchant Bankers Berhad from 1989 to 1991, joining the Corporate Banking Department. He was then appointed as Senior Vice President, Finance, Administration & Secretarial of Kumpulan Fima Berhad from 1991 to 1994. He subsequently became Director of Group Corporate Services cum Divisional Director, Capital Market & Securities of Amanah Capital Partners Berhad from 1994 to 2001. Abdul Wahid also served as Chairman of Amanah Short Deposits Berhad and the Association of Discount Houses in Malaysia as well as Director of Amanah Merchant Bank Berhad during this period.

2001–2004: United Engineers (Malaysia) Berhad (UEM) & UEM World Berhad
Abdul Wahid joined Telekom Malaysia as a Chief Financial Officer (CFO) on 1 March 2001 before he was appointed as Managing Director cum Chief Executive Officer (CEO) of UEM Group in October 2001. UEM Group (then UEM-Renong Berhad Group) was in the middle of debt restructuring plan when Abdul Wahid took over. It led to the takeover by Khazanah Nasional in 2001 which received mixed reactions by the public. The first step that Abdul Wahid did to address these predicaments was to unlock the value of its highway concessions led by PLUS Expressways. The toll concession was reviewed to lower the toll rate increase (from 5% pa to 3.2% pa) but increased every 3 years. This allowed space for UEM's debts to be restructured and thereafter undertook its IPO listing on Bursa Malaysia in July 2002. Another step taken by Abdul Wahid was to dispose the non-core assets in order to reduce the Group's debt to a more manageable level.

After 2 and a half years later, the Group's debt was halved to a more sustainable level of RM16 billion with the bulk of it in the form of project financing. The UEM Group was back on profitable track with annual profit of RM500 million and revalued net assets of RM10 billion. Khazanah Nasional not only achieved its main objectives in the takeover but also doubled the value of its investments within 3 years.

2004–2008: Telekom Malaysia Berhad (TM)
Abdul Wahid returned to Telekom Malaysia (TM) as CEO in July 2004 as part of the larger transformation plan of Government-linked companies (GLCs). He was given a mandate to transform TM into a regional telecommunications company with a particular emphasis on mobile communications. His experience in turning around UEM Group and being the CFO of TM before had given him a very conducive environment to carry out the mandate.

He addressed the fundamentals of the business; organisationally, culturally, customer service wise and business wise. As a part of the efforts to enhance shareholder value, it was decided that the TM Group would be better off being demerged into two separate listed entities. TM International (now known as Axiata Group) with Celcom and other regional mobile communications business under its wings were successfully demerged and listed on Bursa Malaysia in April 2008.

This left TM being repositioned as the National High Speed Broadband (HSBB) Champion spearheading the national HSBB deployment in Public Private Partnership with the Government of Malaysia. The demerger "unleashed" Axiata Group to grow further across Asia.

2008–2013: Maybank
In May 2008, Abdul Wahid was appointed as president and CEO of Maybank, replacing Tan Sri Amirsham Abdul Aziz who was appointed as a Minister in the Prime Minister's Department in charge of the Economic Planning Unit (EPU) after the 12th General Election.

In the three months prior to his arrival, Maybank finalised three major acquisitions', An Binh Bank in Vietnam, Bank International Indonesia (BII) and MCB Bank in Pakistan. He faced three major challenges in the first few months at Maybank. Firstly, he had to follow through on the three major acquisitions costing some RM11 billion and to raise the necessary equity and debt capital required to fund the acquisitions. Second, to deal with the Global Financial Crisis that was unfolding with the collapse of Lehman Brothers, among others, in September 2008. And third, to improve the financial performance of Maybank.

While the corporate finance team was busy completing the three acquisitions, the rest of the management and staff members were busy implementing the performance improvement program called LEAP30 - a series of 30 initiatives identified to improve Maybank's performance and restore its market leadership.

After 18 months, assets and deposits grew faster, customer service enhanced, asset quality improved and profit after tax bounced back to a record RM3.8 billion for financial year 2010. Maybank was back as the number one bank in Malaysia and the most valuable company listed on Bursa Malaysia.

Though this left the team, Board and shareholders happy, there was still a concern when it came to sustainability. Professional fatigue was evident and there was a need to revise the organisational structure and revisit the company's mission. Thus, a "Tiger Summit" was held in Putrajaya which gathered the top 1,000 managers and leaders. This summit agreed to adopt a new mission for Maybank of Humanising Financial Services. This means; to provide people with convenient access to financing, to provide fair terms and pricing, advising customers based on their needs, and being at the heart of the community.

This was not just a rallying call but a reason for being for the 40,000 Maybankers in Malaysia and across Asia. Organisationally, a new "House of Maybank" was created with three business pillars of Community Financial Services, Global Wholesale Banking and Insurance & Takaful with Islamic Financial Services and International Operations straddling across the three business pillars. With the new mission and new "house", Maybank continued to extend its leadership not only as the number one bank in Malaysia but also as one of the top regional banking groups with presence across all ten ASEAN countries.

2013–2016: Minister in the Prime Minister's Department
Abdul Wahid was appointed as a Minister in the Prime Minister's Department in charge of Economic Planning on 5 June 2013. He oversees a number of government agencies such as Economic Planning Unit, Public-Private Partnership Unit (UKAS), Department of Statistics, Ekuiti Nasional Berhad (EKUINAS) and Talent Corporation (TALENCORP), TERAJU and Yayasan Pendidikan Peneraju Bumiputera.

In a statement, Abdul Wahid admitted that being appointed (non-elected) as one of the Minister in the Prime Minister's Department is a humbling experience for him. He pledged that he will do everything in his power to help Malaysia in achieving the vision 2020 vision. He stated that he will use his vast banking experience to help Malaysia by applying it in his department.

He was a member of the Board of Directors of Malaysia Healthcare Travel Council, Council member of East Coast Economic Region Development Council (ECERDC), Northern Corridor Implementation Authority (NCIA), Council Member of Aerospace Malaysia, Board Member of Yayasan Peneraju Pendidikan Bumiputera and Chairman of Investment Committee of Innovation Agency of Malaysia.

2016–2018: Permodalan Nasional Berhad
He was appointed as Group Chairman of Permodalan Nasional Berhad (PNB) on 1 August 2016 following the completion of his term as a Senator and Minister in the Prime Minister's Department. Under his leadership, PNB increased its syariah-compliant investment and financing product with the goal for Malaysia to be the centre of global Islamic banking.

On 29 June 2018, his resignation as the Group Chairman was confirmed by PNB and Malaysia's former Bank Governor Zeti Akhtar Aziz was announced to succeed his position.

2019–present: Universiti Kebangsaan Malaysia and Bursa Malaysia
Abdul Wahid was appointed as the new chairman of Universiti Kebangsaan Malaysia (UKM) board of directors on late 2018 to replace the leaving chairman, Tan Sri Dr Ibrahim Saad. He held the post from 1 November 2018 until 31 October 2021.

He was appointed as the chairman of Bursa Malaysia, the country's stock exchange on 17 April 2020 by the Minister of Finance, Tengku Zafrul Aziz. His term of office started on 1 May, following the retirement of his predecessor, Shireen Ann Zaharah Muhiudeen. The share price of the stock exchange rose following the announcement.

Honours and awards

Honours of Malaysia 
  :
  Commander of the Order of Loyalty to the Crown of Malaysia (PSM) – Tan Sri (4 June 2016)
  :
  Knight Companion of the Order of Sultan Ahmad Shah of Pahang (DSAP) – Dato' (24 October 2003)
  Grand Knight of the Order of Sultan Ahmad Shah of Pahang (SSAP) – Dato' Sri (24 October 2007)
  :
  Knight Grand Companion of the Order of Sultan Sharafuddin Idris Shah (SSIS) – Dato' Setia (11 December 2016)
  :
  Knight Grand Companion of the Order of Loyalty to Negeri Sembilan (SSNS) – Dato' Seri (14 January 2020)

Awards
 Malaysia's CEO of the Year Award 2006 by Business Times/American Express.
 Asian Banker's 2013 Leadership Achievement Award for Malaysia.
 The Edge Value Creator Award 2013.

References

1964 births
Living people
People from Johor
Malaysian Muslims
Malaysian people of Malay descent
Malaysian businesspeople
Malaysian bankers
Malaysian chief executives
Malaysian chairpersons of corporations
Economy ministers of Malaysia
Government ministers of Malaysia
Members of the Dewan Negara
MARA Junior Science College alumni
Commanders of the Order of Loyalty to the Crown of Malaysia
21st-century Malaysian businesspeople
21st-century Malaysian politicians